First Prize! is an album by saxophonist/clarinetist Eddie Daniels recorded in 1966 and released on the Prestige label the following year.

Reception

Allmusic awarded the album 4½ stars with Scott Yanow stating "When one hears this early Eddie Daniels set, it is surprising to realize that he would remain in relative obscurity for almost another 20 years. As shown on the three of the eight selections on which he plays clarinet, Daniels even at this early stage ranked near the top, while his tenor playing on the remaining numbers was already personal and virtuosic".

Track listing 
All compositions by Eddie Daniels except where noted
 "Felicidade" (Antônio Carlos Jobim, Vinícius de Moraes) – 9:48
 "That Waltz" – 6:56
 "Falling in Love with Love" (Richard Rodgers, Lorenz Hart) – 4:40
 "Love's Long Journey" – 2:05	
 "Time Marches On" – 4:05
 "The Spanish Flea" (Julius Wechter) – 4:50
 "The Rocker" – 3:37
 "How Deep Is the Ocean?" (Irving Berlin) – 10:41

Personnel 
Eddie Daniels – tenor saxophone, clarinet
Roland Hanna – piano
Richard Davis – bass
Mel Lewis – drums

References 

1967 albums
Eddie Daniels albums
Prestige Records albums
Albums produced by Cal Lampley
Albums recorded at Van Gelder Studio